Our Father is a 2016 Israeli drama film directed by Meni Yaesh. It was one of five films nominated for the Best Film Award at the Ophir Awards.

Plot
Ovadia is the best bouncer at a high profile club in Tel Aviv, Israel. He and his wife Rachel have been trying to have a kid for 5 years with no success. To make some money Ovadia works as a mover on the side. Shalom Rosenthal, a loan shark, persuades Ovadia to collect money from him. At first Ovadia excells and Shalom pays him well. With this new money Ovadia takes Rachel to the best fertility clinic in Israel. On one hit when Ovadia is supposed to beat up someone that owes money to Shalom he is overcome with emotion and shows mercy. At a picnic with Shalom he tells him that he wants to quit and this leads to a brief argument on which Ovadia ends up punching Shalom. Shalom’ s other goons take Ovadia to a bathroom and beat him up with in an inch of his life. They stop when Ovadia promises to not quit. The last his Ovadia pulls out is opening the back door of h the club so Shalom’s men can enter and kill Ovadia’s boss that he is very close with, Mickey. The film ends showing Ovadia with Rachel and their newborn.

Cast
 Moris Cohen as Ovadia Rachamim
 Rotem Zissman-Cohen as Rachel Rachmim

References

External links
 

2016 films
2016 drama films
Israeli drama films
2010s Hebrew-language films